Gao Qunshu is a Chinese film director.

Filmography
 The Tokyo Trial (2006)
 Old Fish (2008)
 The Message (2009)
 Wind Blast (2010)
 Beijing Blues (2012)
 Crimes of Passion (2013)
 The New Year's Eve of Old Lee (2016)
 Run for Love (2016)

References

External links 

Chinese film directors
Living people
1966 births